Črnic is a Slovene surname. Notable people with the surname include:

 Matic Črnic (born 1992), Slovenian footballer

See also
 Crnić

Slovene-language surnames